Alos-Sibas-Abense is a commune in the Pyrénées-Atlantiques department in the Nouvelle-Aquitaine region in southwestern France.

It is located in the former province of Soule.

The inhabitants of the commune are known as Aloztar-Ziboztar-Oniztar

Geography
Alos-Sibas-Abense is located some 90 km south-east of Bayonne and 80m km west of Lourdes.  The D918 road runs down the eastern border of the commune, but does not enter. Access to the commune is on road D247 from Alcay-Alcabehety-Sunharette in the southwest which runs through the heart of the commune to the village. It then continues to the southeast linking with the D918 at Tardets-Sorholus. Most of the commune is farmland with some forest and it has a network of country roads covering most of the commune.

Hydrography
Located in the Drainage basin of the Adour, the Saison river passes along and forms the eastern border of the commune parallel with the D918 road.  The Aphoura stream (18 km), which is fed by the Ardounc, the Batasse (10.1 km), the Laritolle, the Jaga, and the Uthurrotche erreka, flows near the village and to the Saisson.

Places and hamlets

Abense
Althondo
Ansola
Barnech
Basterrèche
Basterreix
Belle-Sise
Canderats
Choy-Cantaguia
Curutchet
Domec
Eskiéta
Etchandy
Eyhéra
Hastoy
Mendiondoa
Mendisquer
Ohix
La Papeterie
Péko Urupéa
Quihillaborda
La Salle
Samalgagna
Sibas
Uhalte-Borde

Toponymy
The commune name in Basque is Aloze-Ziboze-Onizegaine.

The Basque form of Sibas can be Ziboz(e) or Ziborotz(e).

Jean-Baptiste Orpustan suggested that Abense came from a Roman phonetic change to the Basque Oniz > onise > oénse > auénse > abense. The base of the name is the oronym ona,  also present in Bayonne and Oneix. The modern Basque form (Onizegañia, Onizegañe or Omiz(e)) are equivalent to "Upper" (gain(e)a > gañia).

Brigitte Jobbé-Duval suggests that Oniz is the name of a noble Basque family.

The following table details the origins of the commune name and other names in the commune.

Sources:
Orpustan: Jean-Baptiste Orpustan,  New Basque Toponymy
Raymond: Topographic Dictionary of the Department of Basses-Pyrenees, 1863, on the page numbers indicated in the table. 
Cassini: 1750 Cassini Map 
EHESS: 

Origins:
Luntz:
Soule: Customs of Soule
Duchesne: Duchesne collection volume CXIV

History
Sibas merged with Alos on 23 October 1843 to form Alos-Sibas. On 16 April 1859, following the annexation of part of the territory of Abense-de-Haut, the commune took the name of Alos-Sibas-Abense.

On the same day the commune of Abense-de-Haut disappeared, its territory being divided between Alos-Sibas and Tardets.

Heraldry

Administration
Lists of Successive Mayors of Alos-Sibas-Abense

Until 1843
Alos

Sibas

Abense-de-Haut

Until 1859
Alos-Sibas

Abense-de-Haut

After 1859
Alos-Sibas-Abense

Intercommunality
The town is part of six intercommunal structures:
the Communauté d'agglomération du Pays Basque
the union to support Basque culture
SIVOM of the canton of Tardets
the municipal association for the gaves of Oloron and Mauleon
SIVU for Tourism in Haute-Soule and Barétous
the AEP Union for Soule country

Demography
In 2017 the commune had 319 inhabitants. The population data given in the table and graph below for 1836 and earlier refer to the former commune of Alos, and for 1841-1851 to the former commune of Alos-Sibas.

Economy
Economic activity is mainly focused on agriculture (livestock and pasture). The town is part of the Appellation d'origine contrôlée zone of Ossau-iraty.

Culture and heritage

Civil heritage
Etchandia House, formerly owned by the Etchandy family.
La Salle d'Abense

Religious heritage
The Church of Abense contains a Processional Cross (15th century) which is registered as an historical object.

Environmental heritage
The common practices Controlled burns for prevention of forest fires.

Facilities
The town has an early childhood hub (Child care centre and a creche) and an Ikastola.

See also
Communes of the Pyrénées-Atlantiques department

References

External links
Alos-Sibas-Abense official website 
Alos-Sibas-Abense personal website 
Alos-Sibas-Abense on Géoportail, National Geographic Institute (IGN) website 
Alos, Sibas, and Abens on the 1750 Cassini Map

Communes of Pyrénées-Atlantiques